Hospice-Anthelme Verreau (6 September 1828 – 15 May 1901) was a French-Canadian priest, educator, and historian.

Born in l'Islet, P.Q., Lower Canada, the son of Germain-Alexandre Verreau and Ursule Fournier, Verreau left his classical course at the Quebec Seminary and taught at Ste Thérèse College. In 1857, he was appointed principal of the newly founded Jacques-Cartier Normal School, an office he held until his death. He was made a Lit.D. of Laval (1878) and a Fellow of the Royal Society of Canada. In 1873 he was commissioned by the Quebec Government to investigate certain European archives for materials relating to Canadian history. Besides many contributions to the Historical Society of Montreal, of which he was the first president, and to the Royal Society of Canada, he published (1870–73) two volumes of memoirs concerning the invasion of Canada by the Americans.

He died in Montreal, Quebec in 1901.

Chief publications
Notice sur la fondation de Montréal;
Des commencements de l'église du Canada;
Jacques Cartier; Questions du calendrier civil et ecclésiastique; Questions de droit politique, de législation et d'usages maritimes

References

Attribution
 Cites:
Henry James Morgan, Bibliotheca canadensis (Toronto, 1898);
Henri-Raymond Casgrain, Annuaire de l'Universite Laval (Quebec, 1902);
Adélard Desrosiers, Les Ecoles Normales de la Prov. De Quebec (Montreal, 1909).

1828 births
1901 deaths
19th-century Canadian historians
Canadian male non-fiction writers
French Quebecers
History of Catholicism in Quebec
Université Laval alumni